Émile "Mimile" Buisson (19 August 1902 – 28 February 1956) was a French gangster,  and French public enemy No. 1 for 1950. A member of the French Gang des Tractions Avant, Buisson was responsible for over thirty murders and a hundred robberies. Buisson was pursued and caught by French detective of the Sûreté Nationale Roger Borniche, and was executed in 1956 by the guillotine. Borniche's memoirs on the pursuit, Flic Story, were later made into a film of the same name in 1975, with Buisson portrayed by Jean-Louis Trintignant.

Buisson was born in Paray-le-Monial, Saône-et-Loire, and was jailed at the age of 16 for pickpocketing, swindling and possessing an offensive weapon. He was exiled to Shanghai with his brother for 5 years. Upon returning to France, Buisson was involved in a number of crimes and murders, becoming a member of Paris' criminal organizations, and took part in a hold-up of Troyes in 1937. In 1941 Buisson killed a passenger on board a security van during a robbery, and was captured by police during an identity check. Buisson was regarded as criminally insane and was committed to a psychiatric hospital, only to escape in 1947 with the help of Roger Dekker. Becoming French public enemy No. 1 for 1950, Buisson was eventually captured by Roger Borniche and was executed by guillotine in 1956, being buried at Ivry Cemetery.

1902 births
1956 deaths
Executed French people
Executed gangsters
Executed people from Burgundy
French bank robbers
People executed by France by decapitation
People executed by the French Fourth Republic
People from Paray-le-Monial
Burials at Ivry Cemetery